Born 2 B Blue is a studio album by Steve Miller, released in 1988 by Capitol Records. This is the only solo album that Miller has released, making it his only album not to be credited under the name Steve Miller Band. It consists primarily of jazz standards reinterpreted in a more modern context. It represented a departure from Miller's work with the Steve Miller Band. The album was Miller's final release for Capitol Records, after 20 years with the label.

Track listing

Personnel
 Steve Miller – guitar, vocals
 Billy Peterson – bass
 Ben Sidran – keyboards
 Gordy Knudtson – drums

Additional personnel
 Milt Jackson – vibraphone on "Born to be Blue"
 Phil Woods – alto saxophone on "When Sonny Gets Blue" & "Red Top"
 Bobby Malach – tenor saxophone on "Mary Ann," "God Bless the Child," "Filthy McNasty," & "Just a Little Bit"
 Ricky Peterson – all programming on "Zip-A-Dee-Doo-Dah," additional synthesizers on "Ya Ya" & "Just a Little Bit"
 Bruce Paulson – trombone on "God Bless the Child"
 Steve Faison – percussion on "Zip-A-Dee-Doo-Dah"
 Steve Wiese (engineer) – recorded and mixed at Creation Audio, Minneapolis

References

1988 debut albums
Steve Miller albums
Capitol Records albums
Covers albums
Easy listening albums
Jazz albums by American artists